"5 Foot 9" is a song by American country music singer Tyler Hubbard, best known as one-half of the duo Florida Georgia Line. The song is Hubbard's first release as a solo artist. It was released on May 23, 2022 as the lead single from his self-titled debut solo album.

Content
Tyler Hubbard, one-half of Florida Georgia Line, wrote the song in 2021 with Chase McGill and The Cadillac Three member Jaren Johnston. At the time, Hubbard had not told the other two he was planning to release solo material outside Florida Georgia Line. According to him, the three writers originally did not have any concepts in mind until Johnston began playing a guitar riff. The three then decided to make a list of things they considered "good", such as "dry wood makes good fires". They then added the line "God makes 5 foot 9, brown eyes in a sundress", which was inspired by Hubbard's wife, Hayley. Her actual height is actually five foot ten, but Hubbard decided to keep it as is because it rhymes well with the other lines. Johnston and Hubbard then recorded a demo, which they took to producer Jordan Schmidt. Among the musicians on the final recording was Ilya Toshinsky, who played acoustic guitar, banjo, and Dobro on the song. Schmidt compared the final recording to a Nickel Creek song.

Chart performance
"5 Foot 9" reached number one on the Billboard Country Airplay chart dated November 19, 2022, becoming Hubbard's first number one single as a solo artist after having previously spent time at number one as a member of Florida Georgia Line, and making him the first male artist from a duo to top the chart with a solo single.

Charts

Weekly charts

Year-end charts

Certifications

References

2022 debut singles
Tyler Hubbard songs
Songs written by Tyler Hubbard
Songs written by Chase McGill
Songs written by Jaren Johnston
EMI Records singles
2022 songs